"Waltzing Matilda" is a song developed in the Australian style of poetry and folk music called a bush ballad. It has been described as the country's "unofficial national anthem".

The title was Australian slang for travelling on foot (waltzing) with one's belongings in a "matilda" (swag) slung over one's back. The song narrates the story of an itinerant worker, or "swagman", making a drink of billy tea at a bush camp and capturing a stray jumbuck (sheep) to eat. When the jumbuck's owner, a squatter (grazier), and three troopers (mounted policemen) pursue the swagman for theft, he declares "You'll never catch me alive!" and commits suicide by drowning himself in a nearby billabong (watering hole), after which his ghost haunts the site.

The song, published in 1903, is quite different from the original song, written in 1895. The original lyrics were composed in 1895 by Australian poet, Banjo Paterson, to suit a tune played by Christina Macpherson. In 1903, Marie Cowan changed some of the lyrics, wrote a completely new variation of the tune and published it in sheet music as an advertising jingle for Billy tea. This is the version of "Waltzing Matilda" that we sing today. Extensive folklore surrounds the song and the process of its creation, to the extent that it has its own museum, the Waltzing Matilda Centre in Winton, in the Queensland outback, where Paterson wrote the lyrics. In 2012, to remind Australians of the song's significance, Winton organised the inaugural Waltzing Matilda Day to be held on 6 April, wrongly thought at the time to be the anniversary of its first performance.

The song was first recorded in 1926 as performed by John Collinson and Russell Callow. In 2008, this recording of "Waltzing Matilda" was added to the Sounds of Australia registry in the National Film and Sound Archive, which says that there are more recordings of "Waltzing Matilda" than any other Australian song.

History

Writing of the song

The Australian poet Banjo Paterson wrote the words to "Waltzing Matilda" over a period of some three or four weeks in August 1895 at a number of locations. There are credible accounts of the song being written in Winton and at Dagworth Station, a sheep station 130 km north west of Winton in Central West Queensland, owned by the Macpherson family. Paterson and others have left accounts of the song being written at Dick's Creek, between Winton and Dagworth. There is photographic evidence of the song, at an advanced stage, being sung at Oonderoo station. Paterson's words were written to suit a tune played by 31‑year‑old Christina Macpherson (1864–1936), one of the family members. The instrument that Christina played was a small, very early model of an instrument called an akkordzither or volkszither in Germany. In America, where it became very popular, it was called an autoharp.

On April 24 1894, Christina attended the annual Warrnambool steeplechase meeting in south western Victoria. The music at the meeting was supplied by the Warrnambool Garrison Artillery Band. The first item played by the band was the quick march, “Craigielea”, arranged by English born Australian, Thomas Bulch, in 1893. “Craigielea” was typical contest brass band arrangement with three strains. The first strain was “Bonnie Wood of Craigielea” composed by Glasgow musician, James Barr published in 1818 for Robert Tannahill's 1806 poem, "Thou Bonnie Wood o Craigielea".  Christina had a good memory for songs and, when she had the opportunity, tried to play the first strain by ear on piano.  Christina’s memory was not perfect.  The first strain of "Craigielea" had the musical form AABC. Christina remembered the AAB section but not the C section. To complete her tune, she repeated the second A section. Christina’s tune had the musical form, AABA. This is the musical form of “Waltzing Matilda” sung today.

When Christina arrived at Dagworth in June,1895, she found an autoharp, with three or four chord bars, which belonged to the bookkeeper, John Tait Wilson. While at Dagworth, she took up the autoharp and mastered it. She learnt to play the tune that she heard at Warrnambool.

About seven weeks later, Christina and her brothers went into Winton for a week or so.  Banjo Paterson was in Winton at the same time, visiting his fiancé of seven years, Sarah Riley. In Christina’s own words, “One day I played (from ear) a tune which I had heard played by a band at the races in Warrnambool. Mr Paterson asked me what it was - I could not tell him. He said he thought he could write some lines to it. He then and there wrote the first verse.” The Macphersons invited Paterson and Sarah Riley to return to Dagworth with them.  During his stay, Paterson would have seen the places, heard the stories and encountered the people who inspired the lyrics of the original “Waltzing Matilda”.

 Some of the stories and events that may have inspired the lyrics of “Waltzing Matilda” are below. 
In Queensland, in 1891, the Great Shearers' Strike brought the colony close to civil war and was broken only after the Premier of Queensland, Samuel Griffith, called in the military. In July and August 1894, as the shearing season approached, the strike broke out again in protest at a wage and contract agreement proposed by the ‘squatters'. During July and August, seven shearing sheds in central Queensland were burned by striking union shearers before shearing could begin with ‘scab’ labour. Early on the morning of September 2, a group of striking union shearers, firing rifles and pistols, set fire to the shearing shed at Dagworth.  The fire killed over a hundred sheep. The shed was defended by Constable Michael Daly, Bob Macpherson and his brothers and employees. In the early afternoon of the same day, Senior Constable Austin Cafferty, in Kyuna, was informed that a man had shot himself at a striking shearers’ camp in a billabong 4 miles from Kyuna and about 15 miles from Dagworth.  When he arrived at the camp, S/C Cafferty found the body of Samuel Hoffmeister, also known as “Frenchy”, with a bullet wound through the mouth, in an apparent suicide. Hoffmeister was a known leader of the striking unionists and suspected of being involved in the arson attack at Dagworth on the night before. Later S/C Cafferty was joined by Constable Michael Daley who had travelled from Dagworth. Three days later an inquest into his death was conducted with very limited police resources. The coroner, police magistrate, Ernest Eglington, gave the controversial but convenient verdict of suicide.    

Banjo Paterson was a first-class horseman and loved riding. It is likely that he would have seized any opportunity to go riding at Dagworth. Bob Macpherson (the brother of Christina) and Paterson went riding together and, in Christina's words, "they came to a waterhole (or billabong) & found the skin of a sheep which had been recently killed—all that had been left by a swagman". This incident may have inspired the second verse. Tom Ryan worked at Dagworth in 1895 and recorded an incident in which Paterson accompanied Dagworth horse breaker, Jack Lawton, when he went to the Combo to bring in a mob of horses. They brought them part of the way in and then put them against a fence running into a waterhole. Lawton then took the saddle from his horse and gave it a swim. He then stripped off and dived from a gum tree into the hole. Paterson followed suite. Jack then noticed that the mob of horses were walking away and would probably go back to their starting point. He jumped on his own horse without waiting to don any clothes and galloped after the mob. He was surprised, on looking around, to find his companion had again followed his example. On reaching the station that night, Patterson told him it was the best day's outing he had ever had. There is very little credible evidence of how Banjo spent his time while staying at Dagworth, but it is entirely feasible that, at some time, he visited the Combo Waterhole. He may even have visited the site of the shearers' camp where Frenchy Hoffmeister's body was found.
Some 40 years later, and not long before Christina died, Christina and Banjo each left different accounts of their recollection of the events surrounding the writing of "Waltzing Matilda". In 1934, in his book “Cobbers”, English musician, Dr Thomas Wood, wrote a very inaccurate account of the composition of “Waltzing Matilda”. He stated that it was written on a moment’s inspiration by Banjo Paterson, his sister composing the music equally spontaneously. Christina carefully drafted letter to him to set the record straight. In it, Christina stated, that when the first verse was written, she had travelled to Winton with her brothers and that she had heard the music played by a band at Warrnambool. Christina then added more information from 1895 through to the song’s inclusion in the “Australasian Students Song Book”, which was published in 1911. Christina had a comprehensive memory and was proud of her role in producing the song. About the same time, in a talk prepared for ABC radio, Paterson wrote, that in 1894 the shearers staged a strike by way of expressing themselves, and Macpherson’s shearing shed was burnt down, and a man was picked up dead. .... while resting for lunch or changing horses on our four-in-hand-journeys, Miss Macpherson, afterwards the wife of financial magnate, J McCall McCowan, used to play a little Scottish tune on a zither, and I put words to the tune and called it “Waltzing Matilda”. These scanty details compliment Christina’s account but do not suggest that the song meant a lot to him. Paterson also attributed the playing of the music to the wrong Macpherson sister. Christina's sister Jean, married McCall McCowan. Christina never married. How well did Banjo remember Christina? 

The song itself was first performed on 6 April 1895 by Sir Herbert Ramsay, 5th Bart., at the North Gregory Hotel in Winton, Queensland. The occasion was a banquet for the Premier of Queensland. The song did not very quickly spread: an electronic search of hundreds of Australian newspaper titles between 1895 and 1901 reveals only one report of it being sung. However, the cultural critic, A.A. Phillips, born in 1900, recalled being taught it in his childhood.

In February 2010, ABC News reported an investigation by barrister Trevor Monti that the death of Hoffmeister was more akin to a gangland assassination than to suicide. The same report asserts, "Writer Matthew Richardson says the song was most likely written as a carefully worded political allegory to record and comment on the events of the shearers' strike."

Alternative theories
Several alternative theories for the origins or meaning of "Waltzing Matilda" have been proposed since the time it was written. Still, most experts now essentially agree on the details outlined above. Some oral stories collected during the twentieth century claimed that Paterson had merely modified a pre-existing bush song, but there is no evidence for this. In 1905, Paterson himself published a book of bush ballads he had collected from around Australia entitled Old Bush Songs, with nothing resembling "Waltzing Matilda" in it. Nor do any other publications or recordings of bush ballads include anything to suggest it preceded Paterson. Meanwhile, manuscripts from the time the song originated indicate the song's origins with Paterson and Christina Macpherson, as do their own recollections and other pieces of evidence.

There has been speculation about the relationship "Waltzing Matilda" bears to a British song, "The Bold Fusilier" or "The Gay Fusilier" (also known as "Marching through Rochester", referring to Rochester in Kent and the Duke of Marlborough), a song sung to the same tune and dated by some back to the 18th century but first printed in 1900. There is, however, no documentary proof that "The Bold Fusilier" existed before 1900, and evidence suggests that this song was in fact written as a parody of "Waltzing Matilda" by English soldiers during the Boer War where Australian soldiers are known to have sung "Waltzing Matilda" as a theme. The first verse of "The Bold Fusilier" is:
A bold fusilier came marching back through Rochester
Off from the wars in the north country,
And he sang as he marched
Through the crowded streets of Rochester,
Who'll be a soldier for Marlboro and me?

In 2008, Australian writers and historians, Peter and Sheila Forrest, claimed that the widespread belief that Paterson had penned the ballad as a socialist anthem, inspired by the Great Shearers' Strike, was false and a "misappropriation" by political groups. Forrest asserted that Paterson had in fact written the self-described "ditty" as part of his flirtation with Macpherson, despite his engagement to someone else. This theory was not shared by other historians like Ross Fitzgerald, emeritus professor in history and politics at Griffith University, who argued that the defeat of the strike in the area that Paterson was visiting only several months before the song's creation would have been in his mind, most likely consciously but at least "unconsciously", and thus was likely to have been an inspiration for the song. Fitzgerald stated, "the two things aren't mutually exclusive"a view shared by others who, while not denying the significance of Paterson's relationship with Macpherson, nonetheless recognise the underlying story of the shearers' strike and Hoffmeister's death in the lyrics of the song.

Ownership
Paterson sold the rights to "Waltzing Matilda" and "some other pieces" to Angus & Robertson for five Australian pounds. In 1903, tea trader James Inglis hired Marie Cowan, who was married to Inglis's accountant, to alter the song lyrics for use as an advertising jingle for the Billy Tea company, making it nationally famous. Cowan adapted the lyrics and set them to music in 1903.

Although no copyright applied to the song in Australia and many other countries, the Australian Olympic organisers had to pay royalties to an American publisher, Carl Fischer Music, following the song being played at the 1996 Summer Olympics held in Atlanta. According to some reports, the song was copyrighted by Carl Fischer Music in 1941 as an original composition. However, The Sydney Morning Herald reported that Carl Fischer Music had collected the royalties on behalf of Messrs Allan & Co, an Australian publisher that claimed to have bought the original copyright, though Allan's claim "remains unclear". Arrangements such as those claimed by Richard D. Magoffin remain in copyright in America.

Cowan's melody

Source.

Lyrics

Typical lyrics 
There are no "official" lyrics to "Waltzing Matilda" and slight variations can be found in different sources. Paterson's original lyrics referred to the swagman "drowning himself 'neath the Coolibah Tree". The following lyrics are the Cowan version.

Once a jolly swagman camped by a billabong
Under the shade of a coolibah tree,
And he sang as he watched and waited till his "Billy" boiled,
"You'll come a-waltzing Matilda, with me."

Chorus:
Waltzing Matilda, waltzing Matilda,
You'll come a-waltzing Matilda, with me,
And he sang as he watched and waited till his "Billy" boiled,
"You'll come a-waltzing Matilda, with me."

Down came a jumbuck to drink at that billabong,
Up jumped the swagman and grabbed him with glee,
And he sang as he shoved that jumbuck in his tucker bag,
"You'll come a-waltzing Matilda, with me."

(Chorus)

Up rode the squatter, mounted on his thoroughbred.
Down came the troopers, one, two, and three.
"Whose is that jumbuck you've got in your tucker bag?
You'll come a-waltzing Matilda, with me."

(Chorus)

Up jumped the swagman and sprang into the billabong.
"You'll never catch me alive!" said he
And his ghost may be heard as you pass by that billabong:
"You'll come a-waltzing Matilda, with me."

(Chorus)

Glossary

The lyrics contain many distinctively Australian English words, some now rarely used outside the song. These include:

 Waltzing  derived from the German term auf der Walz, which means to travel while working as a craftsman and learn new techniques from other masters.
 Matilda a romantic term for a swagman's bundle. See below, "Waltzing Matilda".
 Waltzing Matilda from the above terms, "to waltz Matilda" is to travel with a swag, that is, with all one's belongings on one's back wrapped in a blanket or cloth. The exact origins of the term "Matilda" are disputed; one fanciful derivation states that when swagmen met each other at their gatherings, there were rarely women to dance with. Nonetheless, they enjoyed a dance and so danced with their swags, which was given a woman's name. However, this appears to be influenced by the word "waltz", hence the introduction of dancing. It seems more likely that, as a swagman's only companion, the swag came to be personified as a female.

The National Library of Australia states:
Matilda is an old Teutonic female name meaning "mighty battle maid". This may have informed the use of "Matilda" as a slang term to mean a de facto wife who accompanied a wanderer. In the Australian bush a man's swag was regarded as a sleeping partner, hence his "Matilda". (Letter to Rt. Hon. Sir Winston Churchill, KG from Harry Hastings Pearce, 19 February 1958. Harry Pearce Papers, NLA Manuscript Collection, MS2765)

In Germany the terms "Waltzing Matilda" have a very specific meaning:
It refers to the tradition where craftsmen, after having completed their apprenticeship, spend 3 years away from their hometown, travelling on minimal budget, working in many places in order to acquire experience and master their craft. See Journeyman Years for a detailed description. In this context, (Walz) or (auf der Walz) refers to this activity. And (Mathilda) is the patron saint of the road, looking after the men (and women), helping them but sometimes dealing harsh lessons.
Hence (Waltzing Matilda) would refer to the activity of a journey man traveling the road, only carrying a simple swag.

 swagman a man who travelled the country looking for work. The swagman's "swag" was a bed roll that bundled his belongings.
 billabong an oxbow lake (a cut-off river bend) found alongside a meandering river
 coolibah tree a kind of eucalyptus tree which grows near billabongs
 jumbuck a sheep
 billy a can for boiling water, usually 1–1.5 litres (2–3 pints)
 tucker bag a bag for carrying food
 troopers policemen
 squatter Australian squatters started as early farmers who raised livestock on land which they did not have the legal title to use; in many cases they later gained legal use of the land even though they did not have full possession, and became wealthy thanks to these large land holdings. The squatter's claim to the land may be as unfounded as is the swagman's claim to the jumbuck.

Variations
The lyrics of "Waltzing Matilda" have been changed since it was written. The following version, considered to be the 'original', was published by Paterson himself in Saltbush Bill, J.P., and Other Verses in 1917, and appears as follows:
Oh! there once was a swagman camped in the Billabong,
Under the shade of a Coolabah tree;
And he sang as he looked at his old billy boiling,
'Who'll come a-waltzing Matilda with me.'

Who'll come a-waltzing Matilda, my darling,
Who'll come a-waltzing Matilda with me?
Waltzing Matilda and leading a water-bag—
Who'll come a-waltzing Matilda with me?

Down came a jumbuck to drink at the water-hole,
Up jumped the swagman and grabbed him in glee;
And he sang as he put him away in his tucker-bag,
'You'll come a-waltzing Matilda with me!'

Down came the Squatter a-riding his thorough-bred;
Down came Policemen — one, two, and three.
'Whose is the jumbuck you've got in the tucker-bag?
You'll come a-waltzing Matilda with we.' 

But the swagman, he up and he jumped in the water-hole,
Drowning himself by the Coolabah tree;
And his ghost may be heard as it sings in the Billabong,
'Who'll come a-waltzing Matilda with me?'

In a facsimile of the first part of the original manuscript, included in Singer of the Bush, a collection of Paterson's works published by Lansdowne Press in 1983, the first two verses appear as follows:
Oh there once was a swagman camped in the billabong,
Under the shade of a Coolibah tree,
And he sang as he looked at the old billy boiling,
Who'll come a waltzing Matilda with me?

Chorus:
Who'll come a waltzin' Matilda my darling,
Who'll come a waltzin' Matilda with me?
Waltzing Matilda and leading a water bag,
Who'll come a waltzing Matilda with me?

Down came a jumbuck to drink at the water hole,
Up jumped the swagman and grabbed him in glee,
And he sang as he put him away in the tucker bag,
You'll come a waltzin' Matilda with me.

Chorus:
You'll come a waltzing Matilda my darling,
You'll come a waltzing Matilda with me.
Waltzing Matilda and leading a water bag,
You'll come a waltzing Matilda with me.

Some corrections in the manuscript are evident; the verses originally read (differences in italics):
Oh there once was a swagman camped in the billabong,
Under the shade of a Coolibah tree,
And he sang as he looked at the old billy boiling,
Who'll come a roving Australia with me?

Chorus:
Who'll come a rovin (rest missing)
Who'll come a waltzin' Matilda with me?
Waltzing Matilda and leading a tucker bag.
Who'll come a waltzing Matilda with me?

It has been suggested that these changes were from an even earlier version and that Paterson was talked out of using this text, but the manuscript does not bear this out. In particular, the first line of the chorus was corrected before it had been finished, so the original version is incomplete.

The first published version, in 1903, differs slightly from this text:
Oh there once was a swagman camped in the billabongs,
Under the shade of a Coolibah tree,
And he sang as he looked at the old billy boiling,
"Who'll come a waltzing Matilda with me?"

Chorus:
Who'll come a waltzing Matilda, my darling,
Who'll come a waltzing Matilda with me?
Waltzing Matilda and leading a water-bag,
Who'll come a waltzing Matilda with me?

Down came a jumbuck to drink at the waterhole,
Up jumped the swagman and grabbed him in glee,
And he sang as he put him away in the tucker-bag,
You'll come a waltzing Matilda with me.

(Chorus)

Up came the squatter a-riding his thoroughbred,
Up rose the troopers—one, two, a and three.
"Whose the jolly jumbuck you've got in the tucker-bag?
You'll come a waltzing Matilda with we."

(Chorus)

Up sprang the swagman and jumped in the waterhole,
Drowning himself by the Coolibah tree.
And his voice can be heard as it sings in the billabongs,
Who'll come a waltzing Matilda with me.

(Chorus)

By contrast with the original, and also with subsequent versions, the chorus of all the verses was the same in this version. This is also apparently the only version that uses "billabongs" instead of "billabong".

Current variations of the third line of the first verse are "And he sang as he sat and waited by the billabong" or "And he sang as he watched and waited till his billy boiled". Another variation is that the third line of each chorus is kept unchanged from the first chorus, or is changed to the third line of the preceding verse.

There is also the very popular so-called Queensland version that has a different chorus, one very similar to that used by Paterson, and a completely different melody:
Oh there once was a swagman camped in a billabong
Under the shade of the coolibah tree
And he sang as he looked at his old billy boiling
Who'll come a waltzing Matilda with me?

Chorus:
Who'll come a'waltzing Matilda my darling?
Who'll come a'waltzing Matilda with me?
Waltzing Matilda and leading a water bag
Who'll come a'waltzing Matilda with me?

Down came a jumbuck to drink at the water hole
Up jumped the swagman and grabbed him with glee
And he sang as he stowed him away in his tucker bag
You'll come a'waltzing Matilda with me

(Chorus)

Down came the squatter a'riding his thoroughbred
Down came policemen one two three
Whose is the jumbuck you've got in your tucker bag?
You'll come a'waltzing Matilda with me

(Chorus)

But the swagman he up and he jumped in the water hole
Drowning himself by the coolibah tree
And his ghost may be heard as it sings in the billabong
Who'll come a'waltzing Matilda with me?

(Chorus)

Status

In May 1988 the Australasian Performing Right Association (APRA) chief executive, John Sturman, presented five platinum awards, "which recognised writers who had created enduring works which have become a major part of the Australian culture", at the annual APRA Awards ceremony as part of their celebrations for the Australian Bicentenary. One of the platinum awards was for Paterson and Cowan's version of "Waltzing Matilda".

Official use 
The song has never been the officially recognised national anthem in Australia. Unofficially, however, it is often used in similar circumstances. The song was one of four included in a national plebiscite to choose Australia's national song held on 21 May 1977 by the Fraser Government to determine which song was preferred as Australia's national anthem. "Waltzing Matilda" received 28% of the vote compared with 43% for "Advance Australia Fair", 19% for "God Save the Queen" and 10% for "Song of Australia".

Australian passports issued from 2003 have had the lyrics of "Waltzing Matilda" hidden microscopically in the background pattern of most of the pages for visas and arrival/departure stamps.

Sports
"Waltzing Matilda" was used at the 1974 FIFA World Cup and at the Montreal Olympic Games in 1976 and, as a response to the New Zealand All Blacks haka, it has gained popularity as a sporting anthem for the Australia national rugby union team. It is also performed, along with "Advance Australia Fair", at the annual AFL Grand Final.

Matilda the Kangaroo was the mascot at the 1982 Commonwealth Games held in Brisbane, Queensland.

The Australian women's national soccer team is nicknamed the Matildas after this song.

Jessica Mauboy and Stan Walker recorded a version of "Waltzing Matilda" to promote the 2012 Summer Olympics in Australia. It was released as a single on 3 August 2012.

Military units
It is used as the quick march of the 1st Battalion, Royal Australian Regiment and as the official song of the US 1st Marine Division, commemorating the time the unit spent in Australia during the Second World War. Partly also used in the British Royal Tank Regiment's slow march of "Royal Tank Regiment", because an early British tank model was called "Matilda".

Annual Day
6 April has been observed as Waltzing Matilda Day annually in Australia since 2012.

Covers and derivative works
In 1995, it was reported that at least 500 artists in Australia and overseas had released recordings of "Waltzing Matilda", and according to Peter Burgis of the National Film and Sound Archive, it is "one of the most recorded songs in the world". Artists and bands who have covered the song range from rock stars to children's performers such as Burl Ives; to choirs, including the Mormon Tabernacle Choir. Jimmie Rodgers had a US#41 pop hit with the song in 1959.

On 14 April 1981, on Space Shuttle Columbia's first mission, country singer Slim Dusty's rendition was broadcast to Earth.

Films
Versions of the song have been used as the title of, or been prominently featured in, a number of films and television programs.

Waltzing Matilda is a 1933 Australian film directed by and starring Pat Hanna. It features a young Coral Browne.

The introduction of the song was the title of Once a Jolly Swagman, a 1949 British film starring Dirk Bogarde, but it had no connection to Australia or the story told in the song.

An animated short was made in 1958 for Australian television.

Ernest Gold used the song and variations of it extensively in the 1959 film On the Beach.

The 2017 short film Waltzing Tilda features various versions of the song and it is also sung by the main character.

The song is featured in the 2019 film Deadwood: The Movie despite the film being set in 1889, six years before the song was written.

TV series
The theme song of the 1980 Australian television series Secret Valley is sung to a faster version of the tune of "Waltzing Matilda".

Video games
It is the theme song for Australia in the video game Civilization VI.

The song is the basis for a side-quest in Borderlands: The Pre-Sequel, developed by 2K Australia named The Empty Billabong. The player is instructed to search for a man known only as "the Jolly Swagman" at his camp under a coolibah tree where they find his tuckerbag and an audiolog where the Jolly Swagman recounts events identical to the song.

Stage
On the occasion of Queensland's 150-year celebrations in 2009, Opera Queensland produced the revue Waltzing Our Matilda, staged at the Conservatorium Theatre and subsequently touring twelve regional centres in Queensland. The show was created by Jason and Leisa Barry-Smith and Narelle French. The story line used the fictional process of Banjo Paterson writing the poem when he visited Queensland in 1895 to present episodes of four famous Australians: bass-baritone Peter Dawson (1882–1961), soprano Dame Nellie Melba (1861–1931), Bundaberg-born tenor Donald Smith (1922–1998), and soprano Gladys Moncrieff, also from Bundaberg. The performers were Jason Barry-Smith as Banjo Paterson, Guy Booth as Dawson, David Kidd as Smith, Emily Burke as Melba, Zoe Traylor as Moncrieff, and Donna Balson (piano, voice). The production toured subsequently again in several years.

Derivative musical works
 During the 1950s, a parody of the original entitled "Once a Learned Doctor" gained some currency in university circles. It featured lyrics rewritten with reference to the split in the Australian Labor Party in the period 1954 to 1957.
 In 1961, Australian songwriter Jack O'Hagan provided new lyrics to the traditional tune to be called "God Bless Australia" (see that article for its lyrics) that he hoped would become the Australian national anthem.
 Eric Bogle's 1971 song "And the Band Played Waltzing Matilda" relates the story of a former swagman whose comrades got killed in the Gallipoli campaign and who himself loses his legs. The song incorporates the melody and a few lines from "Waltzing Matilda" at its end.
 Rambling Syd Rumpo (played by Kenneth Williams) in the late 1960s BBC radio programme Round the Horne did a parody of "Waltzing Matilda" beginning "Once long ago in the shade of a goolie bush..."
 The Family Car Songbook (1983) presents a "translation" of the song, using the same musical score, into an "American" version.
 Tom Waits' 1976 song "Tom Traubert's Blues" incorporates elements of "Waltzing Matilda".
Australian composer Harry Sdraulig's "Fantasia on Waltzing Matilda" (2020), composed for Yo-Yo Ma and Kathryn Stott.

References

Sources

External links

Waltzing Matilda – Australia's Favourite Song
Who'll come a Waltzing Matilda with me? online exhibition from the National Library of Australia
Matildacentre.com.au, the official website of the Waltzing Matilda Centre, an exhibit in the Qantilda Museum in Winton, Queensland
Papers of Christina McPherson relating to the song "Waltzing Matilda" digitised and held by the National Library of Australia
Waltzing Matilda – The Musical, musically correct transcription of the Christina Macpherson version
 First recording of the song "Waltzing Matilda", australianscreen online
 , Slim Dusty

1895 poems
1903 songs
APRA Award winners
Australian patriotic songs
Australian folk songs
Australian folklore
Poetry by Banjo Paterson
Songs about suicide
Australian country music songs
Oceanian anthems
Australian military marches
Folk ballads